Muusoctopus is a cosmopolitan genus of deep-sea octopus from the family Enteroctopodidae. These are small to medium-sized octopuses which lack an ink sac. Recent work has suggested that these octopuses originated in the North Atlantic and subsequently moved into the North Pacific while the species in the Southern Hemisphere are descended from multiple invasions from northern oceans.

Species
These species are currently classified as members of the genus Muusoctopus:

Muusoctopus abruptus (Sasaki, 1920)
Muusoctopus berryi (Robson, 1924)
Muusoctopus bizikovi Gleadall, Guerrero-Kommritz, Hochberg & Laptikhovsky, 2010
Muusoctopus canthylus (Voss & Pearcy, 1990)
Muusoctopus clyderoperi (O'Shea, 1999)
Muusoctopus eicomar (Vega, 2009)
Muusoctopus eureka (Robson, 1929)
Muusoctopus fuscus (Taki, 1964)
Muusoctopus hokkaidensis (Berry, 1921)
Muusoctopus hydrothermalis (González & Guerra in González, Guerra, Pascual & Briand, 1998)
Muusoctopus januarii (Hoyle, 1885)
Muusoctopus johnsonianus (Allcock, Strugnell, Ruggiero & Collins, 2006)
Muusoctopus karubar (Norman, Hochberg & Lu, 1997)
Muusoctopus leioderma (Berry, 1911)
Muusoctopus levis (Hoyle, 1885)
Muusoctopus longibrachus (Ibáñez, Sepúlveda & Chong, 2006)
Muusoctopus oregonae (Toll, 1981)
Muusoctopus oregonensis (Voss & Pearcy, 1990)
Muusoctopus profundorum (Robson, 1932)
Muusoctopus pseudonymus (Grimpe, 1922)
Muusoctopus rigbyae (Vecchione, Allcock, Piatkowski & Strugnell, 2009)
 (Voss & Pearcy, 1990)
Muusoctopus sibiricus (Loyning, 1930)
Muusoctopus tangaroa (O'Shea, 1999)
Muusoctopus tegginmathae (O'Shea, 1999)
Muusoctopus thielei (Robson, 1932)
Muusoctopus violescens (Taki, 1964)
Muusoctopus yaquinae (Voss & Pearcy, 1990)

References

Cephalopod genera
Enteroctopodidae